Boxford is a town in Essex County, Massachusetts, United States. According to the U.S. Census Bureau, the town's population was 8,203 in 2020.

The original town center of Boxford, along with East Boxford and other areas in the eastern part of the town, comprise the census-designated place of Boxford.

History

Native Americans inhabited northeastern Massachusetts for thousands of years prior to European colonization of the Americas. At the time of contact, the area that would become Boxford was controlled by Agawam sachem Masconomet, but the Agawam would experience severe population loss from virgin soil epidemics, especially in 1617–1619, killing an estimated 50–75% of the indigenous population in the region. Although Boxford was settled by Europeans in 1646, it was not until 1700 that the selectmen of Boxford would pay Masconomet's grandson Samuel English nine pounds for the rights to the town land.

Europeans first settled in Boxford in 1646 as a part of Rowley Village by Abraham Redington. When Boxford was officially incorporated in 1685, about forty families resided there. Farming was the primary occupation of the early settlers, although townspeople also counted craftsmen among their ranks. The original structure of Boxford's First Church was constructed in 1701 in East Boxford Village. As the population of West Boxford expanded, the legislature designated this section of town as precinct 2 in 1735. Town meetings then alternated between East and West parishes. The first West Boxford church building was erected in 1774. The town's largest industry—a match factory located on Lawrence Road—opened its doors just after the end of the American Civil War, and operated from 1866 to 1905.

As part of the American Bicentennial celebrations which took place during the mid-1970s, residents of Boxford, Massachusetts, visited two villages named Boxford in England in 1975. The aim of their trip was to search for the source of their town's name, ultimately deciding that the village of Boxford in the Babergh district of Suffolk, England, was likely the original source. Villagers from Boxford, Suffolk, were then invited to Boxford, Massachusetts, the following summer for two-week homestays with local host families. This second transatlantic exchange, which began in late July 1976, generated media attention from both Evening Standard and the BBC's Nationwide program [Sally's Dumptruck]

Geography

Boxford is divided into Boxford Village (commonly called East Boxford) and West Boxford Village, corresponding to the respective East and West Boxford centers. It is heavily forested and criss-crossed by various streams and brooks, many of which empty into the Ipswich River on Boxford's southern border. A number of ponds dot town as well, among them Stiles Pond, Cedar Pond, Spofford Pond, Lowe Pond, Four Mile Pond and Baldpate Pond. Throughout Boxford there are also a number of scenic hiking trails. It sits in a corner of the Boxford State Forest, near Interstate 95 and the town's border with Middleton.

Small farms are interspersed throughout Boxford. Stone walls, remnants of old farming land boundaries, meander through the area. One major farm located in Boxford is Small Oxx farm, a branch of the main farm, Smolak's, located in North Andover.

The town is bordered by Haverhill to the north, Groveland to the northeast, Georgetown and Rowley to the east, Ipswich and Topsfield to the southeast, Middleton to the southwest, and North Andover to the west.

The eastern end of Boxford is crossed by Interstate 95, with three exits lying within the town. Route 133 crosses through the northern part of town, from North Andover to Georgetown, and Route 97 crosses through the eastern part of town, from Topsfield to Georgetown. The town does not have any means of mass transportation.  The Newburyport/Rockport Line of the MBTA Commuter Rail passes through neighboring Rowley and Ipswich to the east, and the Haverhill/Reading Line passes to the north.  The nearest small airport is Lawrence Municipal Airport, located in North Andover, and the nearest domestic and international air service is Logan International Airport.

Demographics 

As of the census of 2000, there were 7,921 people, 2,568 households, and 2,254 families residing in the town. There were 2,610 housing units at an average density of 42.0 persons/km2 (108.9 persons/sq mi). The racial makeup of the town was 97.37% White, 0.34% African American, 0.11% Native American, 1.21% Asian, 0.03% Pacific Islander, 0.29% from other races, and 0.64% from two or more races.  0.85% of the population were Hispanic or Latino of any race.

There were 2,568 households, out of which 48.5% had children under the age of 18 living with them, 80.0% were married couples living together, 6.0% had a female householder with no husband present, and 12.2% were non-families. 9.7% of all households were made up of individuals, and 4.9% had someone living alone who was 65 years of age or older.  The average household size was 3.08 and the average family size was 3.32.

In the town, the population was spread out, with 32.2% under the age of 18, 4.2% from 18 to 24, 25.8% from 25 to 44, 28.5% from 45 to 64, and 9.3% who were 65 years of age or older.  The median age was 39 years. For every 100 females, there were 98.9 males.  For every 100 females age 18 and over, there were 94.8 males.

The median income for a household in the town was $113,212, and the median income for a family was $119,491. Males had a median income of $90,397 versus $48,042 for females. The per capita income for the town was $48,846.  1.4% of the population and 0.8% of families were below the poverty line.  Out of the total people living in poverty, 0.8% are under the age of 18 and 3.1% are 65 or older

Government and infrastructure
Boxford employs the open town meeting form of government, and is led by a board of selectmen and a town executive secretary.  Boxford has a police department, a fire department with two branches in the main villages, two post offices, a public works department and a library, which is isolated within the town hall.  Boxford has no water department; all residents and businesses have wells and septic.  A second library was located in West Boxford, but due to budget constraints it was closed in 2008.  The nearest hospitals are Merrimack Valley Hospital in Haverhill to the north, Lawrence General to the west, and Beverly Hospital to the south.

On the state level, Boxford is under the jurisdiction of the Central District Court of Essex County, located in Haverhill.  It is patrolled by the Newbury station of Troop A of the Massachusetts State Police.  The town is represented by two representatives, from the Second and Eighteenth Essex districts, in the Massachusetts House of Representatives, and as part of the First Essex and Middlesex district in the Massachusetts Senate.  On the national level, the town is part of Massachusetts's 6th congressional district, and has been represented by Seth Moulton (D) since 2014.  The state's senior Senator, elected in the 2012, is Elizabeth Warren (D), and its junior Senator, elected in 2013, is Ed Markey.

Politics

One of the few communities in Massachusetts to have more registered Republicans than Democrats, the town is more conservative than the rest of the state. It was the only town not to vote to reelect Senator John Kerry in 2008.  In 2012, Mitt Romney received 59% of the vote in Boxford compared to President Obama's 40%. Hillary Clinton, however, became the first Democratic presidential nominee to win the town in the 21st Century in 2016. The former Secretary of State defeated Republican entrepreneur Donald Trump 47.93–42.85 percent of the vote, with 5.80 percent going to Libertarian Gary Johnson. In 2020, Boxford behaved much more like most other Massachusetts towns, with Joe Biden carrying the town by a robust 15 point margin.

Education

Boxford has one high school, Masconomet Regional High School, named after Chief Masconomet, sagamore of the Agawam tribe, who lived in Essex County at the time of English colonization. Masconomet is a regional school, serving the towns of Boxford, Middleton, and Topsfield. The school was commonly believed to be in Topsfield because it had a Topsfield street address. However, the school, which is located on Endicott Road, lies entirely within Boxford. Students may also elect to attend Essex-North Shore Technical and Agricultural High School in Danvers.  Nearby private schools include The Governor's Academy in Byfield; Pingree School in South Hamilton; St. John's Preparatory School (boys only) in Danvers; Phillips Academy in Andover; and Brooks School in North Andover.

Masconomet Regional Middle School is also located in Boxford, and is attached to the high school.  There are also three elementary schools in Boxford. The Harry Lee Cole School, which serves Preschool through Grade 2, is located near East Boxford center. The Spofford Pond School, serving Grades 3 through 6, is located on the western side of the town's geographic center. Boxford Academy, Preschool–5th grade, is located in First Church Congregational Boxford on Georgetown Road.

Boxford also has two public elementary schools, Spofford Pond School and Harry Lee Cole School, Cole School as its commonly called is Preschool to 2nd grade, and Spofford goes from 3rd to 6th grade.

Points of interest

Boxford State Forest, near Interstate 95 and the towns of Topsfield and Middleton, boasts numerous walking trails that weave through heavily forested areas. There are also smaller parks and trails like the Wildcat trail and Witch Hollow Farm trails located within the thick forests.  Much of the open lands within town are managed by the Boxford Trails Association/Boxford Open Land Trust.

Commercial landmarks in and around town include Benson's Ice Cream, Paisley's Farm Stand and West Village Provisions in West Boxford center, Ingaldsby Farm, the Boxford Community store in East Boxford (also known as "Jack's" or "Wayne's", after its former and current owners), and the Boxford House of Pizza, which lies near the border of Boxford and Georgetown.
Boxford is also well known for its Apple Festival, happening each fall. The apple festival takes place on the streets near Waynes.
"Witch Hollow Farm", (a.k.a. the Tyler-Wood House) built  by Capt. John Tyler the son of Moses Tyler whose sister-in-law, Rebecca Eames was tried in the famous 1693 Salem Witch Trials, found at the intersection of Main Street and Ipswich Road in Boxford. The house gets its name from a hollow that was on the Tyler property in the 1690s where Rebecca Eames claimed, in her trial, that she was bewitched by the Devil. It is a nationally recognized "Haunted House".

The town has a retirement community called Four Mile Village which sits adjacent to Four Mile Pond. The waiting list to get into this community is significant, and prospective applicants must either be former Boxford residents, or primary family members of current Boxford residents.

Boxford's centrally located Stiles Pond is the site for the town beach, where membership can be purchased by Boxford residents only, each season for a nominal fee through the Boxford Athletic Association (BAA).  The adjacent ballpark and play area were recently designated by unanimous vote at Town Meeting as "Keith Koster Memorial Baseball Park" in memory of one of Boxford's beloved young people, a former Boxford beach lifeguard, baseball and football player who fell victim to a senseless act of crime in 2006.

Baldpate Pond, and the adjacent state recreation area, is another popular swimming, fishing, boating, and hiking location.

Camp Rotary is a popular summer co-ed boarding camp located on Stiles Pond off Ipswich Road in Boxford. Danvers YMCA holds another popular summer day camp on Stiles Pond, next to the town beach.

Recently constructed is the Boxford Commons. Boxford Commons is an outdoor sports recreation area that includes a football/soccer/field hockey fields. Boxford Commons also includes a play area for younger children. The Commons is located on Captain Cashin way, off of Middleton Rd near Harry Lee Cole School and the Boxford Fire Department. The fields are primarily used for sports for toddlers up to middle schoolers. The main field is a turf field used primarily for football and soccer.

In popular culture
The fictional character captain Ed Mercer of the American science-fiction television series The Orville was from Boxford in the late 24th century.

Notable people
 Mark Bavaro (born 1963), Pro Bowl football player for the New York Giants
 Raymond Bourque (born 1960), Boston Bruins – Hall of Fame member – former team captain
 Johnny Bucyk (born 1935), Boston Bruins – Hall of Famer – former team captain
 Thomas Knowlton (1740–1776), colonel in the Continental Army during the American Revolution
 Chris Kreider (born 1991), Boston College ice hockey player and current member of the New York Rangers
 Earle O. Latham (1908–1999), first vice-president of the Federal Reserve Bank of Boston
 Alice Freeman Palmer (1855–1902), educator and president of Wellesley College
 Sidney Perley (1858–1928), lawyer, writer, author, poet and historian
 Rufus Porter (1792–1884), painter, designer of the Colt revolver, and founder of Scientific American
 Debra Jo Rupp (born 1951), actress, known for her role as Kitty Foreman in That '70s Show
 Henry Knox Sherrill (1890–1980), an Episcopal clergyman and the 20th Presiding Bishop of the Episcopal Church from 1947 to 1958, having previously served as Bishop of Massachusetts (1930–1947)
 Jermaine Wiggins, New England Patriots
 Carl Yastrzemski (born 1939), longtime left fielder for the Boston Red Sox and a Major League Baseball Hall of Fame member
 Dan Ross (born 1957), Cincinnati Bengals tight end, [Pro Bowl 1982], [Super Bowl XVI, 11 receptions]

References

Sources

Perley, Sidney. History of Boxford, Essex County, Massachusetts. Full images at books.google.Published 1880.
Perley, Francis, Samuel Wood, Moses Carleton. 1795 Map of Boxford.
Dorman, Moses. 1830 Map of Boxford.
Beers, D.G. 1872 Atlas of Essex County 1872 Map of Boxford. Plate 57.
Walker, George H. 1884 Atlas of Essex County 1884 Map of Boxford. Plate 109.
Vital Records of Boxford to 1849. Originally published by the Topsfield Historical Society in 1905. Transcribed and put online by John Slaughter and Jodi Salero 2007.
Boxford Town Records 1685–1706. Transcribed by Sidney Perley in 1880. From page 41 of Volume 5 of The Historical Collections of the Topsfield Historical Society. Published 1899. Full image and OCR at books.google.

External links 

 Boxford-Topsfield Newcomers & Natives Club
 https://www.town.boxford.ma.us/

 
Populated places established in 1645
1645 establishments in Massachusetts